Lincoln is a city in Talladega County, Alabama, United States. It was incorporated in 1911. At the 2020 census, the population was 6,845. It was named for Major General Benjamin Lincoln, who served in the American army during the Revolutionary War.

The Talladega Superspeedway, 
the International Motorsports Hall of Fame and the Talladega Municipal Airport are all located in Lincoln.

Geography
Lincoln is located at  (33.593156, -86.138879). It is home to Honda Manufacturing of Alabama, employing over 4,000 people. Talladega Superspeedway race track is located near the city. It is located off of exit 173 along I-20, which is just outside the city limits.

The city is located along Interstate 20, which runs west to east through the southern part of the city. Access to the city can be found from exits 165 and 168. Via I-20, Birmingham is 44 mi (71 km) west, and Atlanta is 106 mi (171 km) east. U.S. Route 78 also runs west to east through the city. Alabama State Route 77 connects the city with Talladega, which is 13 mi (21 km) south.

Education
Lincoln has three public schools in the Talladega County Board of Education, Lincoln Elementary School, Charles R. Drew Middle School, and Lincoln High School, Home of The Golden Bears. The first graduate of Lincoln High School was the famous Cities Service Company CEO Burl S. Watson, who graduated from LHS in 1912.

The Birmingham Supplementary School Inc. (BSS, バーミングハム日本語補習校 Bāminguhamu Nihongo Hoshūkō), a part-time Japanese school, has its offices at the Honda Manufacturing of Alabama, LLC facility in unincorporated Talladega County, near Lincoln. It holds its classes at the Shelby-Hoover campus of Jefferson State Community College in Hoover. The school first opened on September 1, 2001.

Demographics

2000 census
At the 2000 census, there were 4,577 people, 1,831 households, and 1,354 families living in the city. The racial makeup of the city was 71.90% White, 27.05% Black or African American, 0.31% Native American, 0.07% Asian, 0.07% from other races, and 0.61% from two or more races. 0.70% of the population were Hispanic or Latino of any race.

Of the 1,831 households 28.5% had children under the age of 18 living with them, 58.0% were married couples living together, 12.7% had a female householder with no husband present, and 26.0% were non-families. 22.3% of households were one person and 5.9% were one person aged 65 or older. The average household size was 2.50 and the average family size was 2.89.

The age distribution was 22.9% under the age of 18, 8.3% from 18 to 24, 28.4% from 25 to 44, 28.8% from 45 to 64, and 11.6% 65 or older. The median age was 39 years. For every 100 females, there were 95.2 males. For every 100 females age 18 and over, there were 92.5 males.

The median household income was $34,053 and the median family income  was $36,900. Males had a median income of $29,407 versus $24,102 for females. The per capita income for the city was $18,442. About 9.4% of families and 13.4% of the population were below the poverty line, including 17.6% of those under age 18 and 26.1% of those age 65 or over.

2010 census
At the 2010 census, there were 6,266 people, 2,478 households, and 1,785 families living in the city. The racial makeup of the city was 73.3% White, 23.4% Black or African American, 0.5% Native American, 0.4% Asian, 1.0% from other races, and 1.4% from two or more races. 1.9% of the population were Hispanic or Latino of any race.

Of the 1,831 households 29.3% had children under the age of 18 living with them, 51.5% were married couples living together, 15.3% had a female householder with no husband present, and 28.0% were non-families. 22.9% of households were one person and 7.5% were one person aged 65 or older. The average household size was 2.51 and the average family size was 2.94.

The age distribution was 23.1% under the age of 18, 7.8% from 18 to 24, 27.4% from 25 to 44, 29.2% from 45 to 64, and 12.5% 65 or older. The median age was 39.4 years. For every 100 females, there were 96.8 males. For every 100 females age 18 and over, there were 95.0 males.

The median household income was $36,919 and the median family income  was $42,139. Males had a median income of $36,991 versus $21,804 for females. The per capita income for the city was $19,123. About 11.1% of families and 14.3% of the population were below the poverty line, including 22.4% of those under age 18 and 16.7% of those age 65 or over.

2020 census

As of the 2020 United States census, there were 6,845 people, 2,546 households, and 1,908 families residing in the city.

Industry
Honda, through its subsidiary, Honda Manufacturing of Alabama, operates a manufacturing plant in Lincoln.  , Honda Odyssey, Honda Pilot, and Honda Ridgeline are built there, as well as the Honda J V6 engine.

Notable people
 Pleasant Crump, last verifiable veteran who fought for the Confederacy during the American Civil War
 Burl S. Watson, President and CEO of Cities Service Company during parts of the 1950s and 1960s
Darrell Ingram, 1968-1970 as noted in the Talladega Daily Home newspaper Lincoln Legend 
 William (Bill) Brewer , 1968-1970 Lincoln Legend as noted in the Talladega Daily Home newspaper
 {William C. Sullivan} Former mayor of the city and Circuit Judge Talladega County.

References

External links
Official Site
http://www.lincolnalabama.com/schools/

Cities in Alabama
Cities in Talladega County, Alabama